Ani (Ánion;) is a ruined medieval Armenian city now situated in Turkey's province of Kars, next to the closed border with Armenia.

Between 961 and 1045, it was the capital of the Bagratid Armenian kingdom that covered much of present-day Armenia and eastern Turkey. The iconic city was often referred to as the "City of 1,001 Churches," though the number was significantly less. To date, 50 churches, 33 cave chapels and 20 chapels have been excavated by archaeologists and historians. Ani stood on various trade routes and its many religious buildings, palaces, and sophisticated fortifications distinguished it from other contemporary urban centers in the Armenian kingdom. Among its most notable buildings was the Cathedral of Ani, which is associated with early examples of Gothic architecture and that scholars argue influenced the great cathedrals of Europe in the early gothic and Romanesque styles; its ribbed vaulting would not be seen in European cathedrals until at least two centuries later. At its height, Ani was one of the world's largest cities, with a population of well over 100,000.

Renowned for its splendor, Ani was sacked by the Mongols in 1236.  Ani never recovered from a devastating 1319 earthquake and, more significantly, from the shifting of regional trade routes, and was abandoned by the 17th century. Ani is a widely recognized cultural, religious, and national heritage symbol for Armenians. According to Razmik Panossian, Ani is one of the most visible and ‘tangible’ symbols of past Armenian greatness and hence a source of pride. In 2016, it was added onto the UNESCO World Heritage List.

Toponym
The city took its name from the Armenian fortress-city and pre-Christian religious center of Ani-Kamakh located in the region of Daranaghi in Upper Armenia. Ani was also previously known as Khnamk, although historians are uncertain as to why it was called so; according to philologist and Armenologist Heinrich Hübschmann, this name has nothing to do with the ordinary Armenian verb khnamel ("to care for"). According to the second edition of the Encyclopedia of Islam: "A suggestion has been made that the town may owe its name to a temple of the Iranian goddess Anāhita (the Greek Anaďtis)".

Location
The city is located on a triangular site, visually dramatic and naturally defensive, protected on its eastern side by the ravine of the Akhurian River and on its western side by the Bostanlar or Tzaghkotzadzor valley. The Akhurian is a branch of the Araks River and forms part of the currently closed border between Turkey and Armenia.

The site is located in the Turkish province of Kars. A bus ride from the city of Kars, one of the closest inhabited cities to Ani located in northeastern Turkey, is one of the only ways to get to the city of Ani currently. Kars is currently an important center for local livestock trades and cheese production. It is linked by railroad with many important Turkish cities and is also considered to be an important military site due to its positioning near Turkey's border with Armenia. Across the border is the Armenian village of Kharkov, part of Shirak Province.

History

Early history
Armenian chroniclers such as Yeghishe and Ghazar Parpetsi first mentioned Ani in the 5th century. They described it as a strong fortress built on a hilltop and a possession of the Armenian Kamsarakan dynasty.

Bagratuni capital

By the early 9th century, the former territories of the Kamsarakans in Arsharunik and Shirak (including Ani) had been incorporated into the territories of the Armenian Bagratuni dynasty. The Bagratuni dynasty was the second notable dynasty in the Armenian kingdom. They secured their independence from the Arabs near the end of the 9th century after being controlled by the Persians and Umayyad Arabs for many years at this point. The king of Bagratid Armenia that led to this independence was Ashot I. He had a short-lived position as the king of the Bagratid dynasty, however, the impact of securing the freedom of the dynasty would last for many years. His son, Smbat I, ruled directly after he did. The Bagratid dynasty consisted of many sub-kingdoms, the most notable of which were the Kingdom of Kars, Lori, Syunik, Artsakh, and Vaspurakan. The Bagratuni dynasty led to some of the most notable works of art and architecture in Armenia's history, one of which being the Cathedral of Ani. The leader of the Bagratid dynasty, Ashot Msaker (Ashot the Meateater) (806–827) was given the title of ishkhan (prince) of Armenia by the Caliphate in 804. In 961, king Ashot III (953–77) transferred the capital from Kars to Ani. Ani expanded rapidly during the reign of King Smbat II (977–89). In 992 the Armenian Catholicosate moved its seat to Ani. In the 10th century the population was perhaps 50,000–100,000. By the start of the eleventh century the population of Ani was well over 100,000, and its renown was such that it was known as the "city of forty gates" and the "city of a thousand and one churches." Ani also became the site of the royal mausoleum of Bagratuni kings.

Ani attained the peak of its power during the long reign of King Gagik I (989–1020). After his death his two sons quarreled over the succession. The eldest son, Hovhannes-Smbat (1020–41), gained control of Ani while his younger brother, Ashot IV (1020–40), controlled other parts of the Bagratuni kingdom. Hovhannes-Smbat, fearing that the Byzantine Empire would attack his now-weakened kingdom, made the Byzantine Emperor Basil II his heir. When Hovhannes-Smbat died in 1041, Emperor Michael IV the Paphlagonian, claimed sovereignty over Ani. The new king of Ani, Gagik II (1042–45), opposed this and several Byzantine armies sent to capture Ani were repulsed. However, in 1046 Ani surrendered to the Byzantines, after Gagik was invited to Constantinople and detained there, and at the instigation of pro-Byzantine elements among its population. A Byzantine governor was installed in the city.

Cultural and economic center

Ani lied along any previously important trade routes, but because of its size, power, and wealth it became an important trading hub. Its primary trading partners were the Byzantine Empire, the Persian Empire, the Arabs, as well as smaller nations in southern Russia and Central Asia.

Gradual decline and abandonment
In 1064, a large Seljuk army under Alp Arslan attacked Ani; after a siege of 25 days, they captured the city and slaughtered its population. An account of the sack and massacres in Ani is given by the Turkish historian Sibt ibn al-Jawzi, who quotes an eyewitness saying:

In 1072, the Seljuks sold Ani to the Shaddadids, a Muslim Kurdish dynasty. The Shaddadids generally pursued a conciliatory policy towards the city's overwhelmingly Armenian and Christian population and actually married several members of the Bagratid nobility. Whenever the Shaddadid governance became too intolerant, however, the population would appeal to the Christian Kingdom of Georgia for help. The Georgians captured Ani five times between 1124 and 1209: in 1124, 1161, 1174, 1199, and 1209. The first three times, it was recaptured by the Shaddadids. In the year 1199, Georgia's Queen Tamar captured Ani and in 1201 gave the governorship of the city to the generals Zakare and Ivane. Zakare was succeeded by his son Shanshe (Shahnshah). Zakare's new dynasty — the Zakarids — considered themselves to be the successors to the Bagratids. Prosperity quickly returned to Ani; its defences were strengthened and many new churches were constructed. The Mongols unsuccessfully besieged Ani in 1226, but in 1236 they captured and sacked the city, massacring large numbers of its population. Under the Mongols the Zakarids continued to rule Ani, as the vassals of the Georgian monarch.

By the 14th century, the city was ruled by a succession of local Turkish dynasties, including the Jalayrids and the Kara Koyunlu (Black Sheep clan) who made Ani their capital. It was ruined by an earthquake in 1319. Tamerlane captured Ani in the 1380s. On his death the Kara Koyunlu regained control but transferred their capital to Yerevan. In 1441 the Armenian Catholicosate did the same. The Persian Safavids then ruled Ani until it became part of the Turkish Ottoman Empire in 1579. A small town remained within its walls at least until the middle of the seventeenth century, but the site was entirely abandoned by 1735 when the last monks left the monastery in the Virgin's Fortress or Kizkale.

Modern times

In the first half of the 19th century, European travelers discovered Ani for the outside world, publishing their descriptions in academic journals and travel accounts. The private buildings were little more than heaps of stones but grand public buildings and the city's double wall were preserved and reckoned to present "many points of great architectural beauty". Ohannes Kurkdjian produced a stereoscopic image of Ani in the second half of the 19th century.

In 1878, the Ottoman Empire's Kars region—including Ani—was incorporated into the Russian Empire's Transcaucasian region. In 1892 the first archaeological excavations were conducted at Ani, sponsored by the St. Petersburg Academy of Sciences and supervised by the Georgian archaeologist and orientalist Nicholas Marr (1864–1934). Marr's excavations at Ani resumed in 1904 and continued yearly until 1917. Large sectors of the city were professionally excavated, numerous buildings were uncovered and measured, the finds were studied and published in academic journals, guidebooks for the monuments and the museum were written, and the whole site was surveyed for the first time. Emergency repairs were also undertaken on those buildings that were most at risk of collapse. A museum was established to house the tens of thousands of items found during the excavations. This museum was housed in two buildings: the Minuchihr mosque, and a purpose-built stone building. Armenians from neighboring villages and towns also began to visit the city on a regular basis, and there was even talk by Marr's team of building a school for educating the local Armenian children, building parks, and planting trees to beautify the site.

In 1918, during the latter stages of World War I, the armies of the Ottoman Empire were fighting their way across the territory of the newly declared Republic of Armenia, capturing Kars in April 1918. At Ani, attempts were made to evacuate the artifacts contained in the museum as Turkish soldiers were approaching the site. About 6,000 of the most portable items were removed by archaeologist Ashkharbek Kalantar, a participant of Marr's excavation campaigns. At the behest of Joseph Orbeli, the saved items were consolidated into a museum collection; they are currently part of the collection of Yerevan's State Museum of Armenian History.
Everything that was left behind was later looted or destroyed. Turkey's surrender at the end of World War I led to the restoration of Ani to Armenian control, but a resumed offensive against the Armenian Republic in 1920 resulted in Turkey's recapture of Ani. In 1921 the signing of the Treaty of Kars formalized the incorporation of the territory containing Ani into the Republic of Turkey.

In May 1921, the government minister Rıza Nur ordered the commander of the Eastern Front, Kazım Karabekir, for the monuments of Ani to "be wiped off the face of the earth." Karabekir records in his memoirs that he has vigorously rejected this command and never carried it out.  Some destruction did take place, including most of Marr's excavations and building repairs. In October of the same year, a separate treaty was signed between Turkey and the RSFSR, confirming the border between Turkey and the soviet republic of Armenia as it is today. The Russian negotiator Ganeckij of this treaty tried to include Ani into the soviet republic of Armenia, but Karabekir did not agree.

During the Cold War, Ani lay on the Turkish-Soviet border, a segment of the Iron Curtain. In the 1950s Ani was part of the USSR's territorial claims on Turkey. In 1968 there were negotiations between the Soviet Union and Turkey, in which Ani would be transferred to Soviet Armenia in exchange for two Kurdish villages being transferred to Turkey, however nothing resulted from the talks.

Current state
Today, according to Lonely Planet and Frommer's travel guides to Turkey: Official permission to visit Ani is no longer needed. Just go to Ani and buy a ticket. If you don't have your own car, haggle with a taxi or minibus driver in Kars for the round-trip to Ani, perhaps sharing the cost with other travelers. If you have trouble, the Tourist Office may help. Plan to spend at least a half-day at Ani. It's not a bad idea to bring a picnic lunch and a water bottle.

During the Cold War, and until 2004, a permit from the Turkish Ministry of Culture was required. At one point in the 1980s, photography was banned, as the site lay on the then Turkish-Soviet border.

From the Armenian side of the border, in Shirak Province, an observation post has been set up near the village of Haykadzor, complete with an information panel, but the view is very poor. The outpost of Kharkov offers an excellent view, but access is restricted by border troops and Russian military personnel. Permission to visit is granted at the Ministry of Foreign Affairs in Yerevan for free and takes one week.

According to The Economist, Armenians have "accused the Turks of neglecting the place in a spirit of chauvinism. The Turks retort that Ani's remains have been shaken by blasts from a quarry on the Armenian side of the border."

Another commentator said: Ani is now a ghost city, uninhabited for over three centuries and marooned inside a Turkish military zone on Turkey's decaying closed border with the modern Republic of Armenia. Ani's recent history has been one of continuous and always increasing destruction. Neglect, earthquakes, cultural cleansing, vandalism, quarrying, amateurish restorations and excavations – all these and more have taken a heavy toll on Ani's monuments.

In the estimation of the Landmarks Foundation (a non-profit organization established for the protection of sacred sites) this ancient city "needs to be protected regardless of whose jurisdiction it falls under. Earthquakes in 1319, 1832, and 1988, all have had devastating effects on the architecture of the city. The city of Ani is a sacred place which needs ongoing protection."

Turkey's authorities say they will do their best to conserve and develop the site and the culture ministry has listed Ani among the sites it is keenest to conserve. Contrary to the Armenian allegations of cultural cleansing, in the words of Mehmet Ufuk Erden, the local governor: "By restoring Ani, we'll make a contribution to humanity...We will start with one church and one mosque, and over time we will include every single monument."

In an October 2010 report titled Saving Our Vanishing Heritage, Global Heritage Fund identified Ani as one of 12 worldwide sites most "On the Verge" of irreparable loss and destruction, citing insufficient management and looting as primary causes.

The World Monuments Fund (WMF) placed Ani on its 1996, 1998, and 2000 Watch Lists of 100 Most Endangered Sites. In May 2011, WMF announced it was beginning conservation work on the cathedral and Church of the Holy Redeemer in partnership with the Turkish Ministry of Culture.

UNESCO World Heritage Site 

In March 2015, it was reported that Turkey will nominate Ani to be listed as a UNESCO World Heritage Site in 2016. The archaeological site of Ani was inscribed as a UNESCO World Heritage Site on July 15, 2016. According to art historian Heghnar Zeitlian Watenpaugh the addition "would secure significant benefits in protection, research expertise, and funding." It gained this status due to its amazing representation of medieval Armenian architecture, however, there were three main criteria that further explain why this aspect of Ani is significant. The first of these criteria is that "Ani was a meeting place for Armenian, Georgian, and diverse Islamic cultural traditions that were reflected in the architectural design, material, and decorative details of the monuments". Ani's location on the silk road brought in many visitors from various parts of the world, these visitors brought with them new cultures and architectural styles. This unique combination of residents in the city led many of the buildings in Ani to have a never-before-seen architectural style that is distinct to this region of the world. 

This new style, formed when Ani was at its prime, still has a large impact on the current architecture in its region. The second criterion that caused Ani to gain the status of "outstanding universal value" from UNESCO is the fact that "Ani bears exceptional testimony to Armenian cultural, artistic, architectural, and urban design development and it is an extremely extraordinary representation of Armenian religious architecture known as the 'Ani school', reflecting its techniques, style, and material characteristics". Ani's architecture is an important reminder to the citizens of Armenia of their past. Its buildings have beautiful stone working and architectural designs that were very ahead of their time, this is a major source of pride for the Armenian people. The third criterion that gained Ani the right to be protected is that "Ani offers a wide panorama of medieval architectural development thanks to the presence at the site of almost all the architectural types that emerged in the region in the course of six centuries from 7th to 13th centuries AD". This is due to the cities "military, religious, and civil buildings". UNESCO states that Ani "is also considered a rare settlement", this is because many different styles of Armenian churches can be seen throughout the city, the styles of these churches were developed between the 4th and 8th century AD.

Ani is currently classified by UNESCO as a 1st degree archaeological conservation site. This range of protection is continually being enlarged by UNESCO, however, as even Ani's surrounding areas are classified as 3rd-degree archaeological conservation sites. The Ministry of Culture and Tourism is the main organization in charge of the conservation of Ani, however, the General Directorate of Cultural Heritage and Museums also participates in helping with tasks such as restoration. There are also some other local branches in charge of some of the conservation efforts.

Monuments at Ani
All the structures at Ani are constructed using the local volcanic basalt, a sort of tufa stone. It is easily carved and comes in a variety of vibrant colors, from creamy yellow, to rose-red, to jet black. It is important to note that throughout the attacks and natural disasters Ani has faced throughout the years, all of the buildings have at least significant structural damages, or have otherwise been completely destroyed. The most important surviving monuments are as follows.

The Cathedral

Also known as Surp Asdvadzadzin (the Church of the Holy Mother of God), its construction was started in the year 989, under King Smbat II. Work was halted after his death, and was only finished in 1001 (or in 1010 under another reading of its building inscription). The design of the cathedral was the work of Trdat, the most celebrated architect of medieval Armenia. The cathedral is a domed basilica (the dome collapsed in 1319). The interior contains several progressive features (such as the use of pointed arches and clustered piers) that give to it the appearance of Gothic architecture (a style which the Ani cathedral predates by several centuries).

Surp Stephanos Church
There is no inscription giving the date of its construction, but an edict in Georgian is dated 1218. The church was referred to as "Georgian". During this period "Georgian" did not simply mean an ethnic Georgian, it had a denominational meaning and would have designated all those in Ani who professed the Chalcedonian faith, mostly Armenians. Although the Georgian Church controlled this church, its congregation would have mostly been Armenians.

The church of St Gregory of Tigran Honents
This church, finished in 1215, is the best-preserved monument at Ani. It was built during the rule of the Zakarids and was commissioned by the wealthy Armenian merchant Tigran Honents. Its plan is of a type called a domed hall. In front of its entrance are the ruins of a narthex and a small chapel that are from a slightly later period. The exterior of the church is spectacularly decorated. Ornate stone carvings of real and imaginary animals fill the spandrels between blind arcade that runs around all four sides of the church. The interior contains an important and unique series of frescoes cycles that depict two main themes. In the eastern third of the church is depicted the Life of Saint Gregory the Illuminator, in the middle third of the church is depicted the Life of Christ. Such extensive fresco cycles are rare features in Armenian architecture – it is believed that these ones were executed by Georgian artists, and the cycle also includes scenes from the life of St. Nino, who converted the Georgians to Christianity. In the narthex and its chapel survive fragmentary frescoes that are more Byzantine in style.

The church of the Holy Redeemer

This church was completed shortly after the year 1035. It had a unique design: 19-sided externally, 8-apsed internally, with a huge central dome set upon a tall drum. It was built by Prince Ablgharib Pahlavid to house a fragment of the True Cross. The church was largely intact until 1955, when the entire eastern half collapsed during a storm.

The church of St Gregory of the Abughamrents
This small building probably dates from the late 10th century. It was built as a private chapel for the Pahlavuni family. Their mausoleum, built in 1040 and now reduced to its foundations, was constructed against the northern side of the church. The church has a centralised plan, with a dome over a drum, and the interior has six exedera.

King Gagik's church of St Gregory
Also known as the Gagikashen, this church was constructed between the years 1001 and 1005 and intended to be a recreation of the celebrated cathedral of Zvartnots at Vagharshapat. Nikolai Marr uncovered the foundations of this remarkable building in 1905 and 1906. Before that, all that was visible on the site was a huge earthen mound. The designer of the church was the architect Trdat. The church is known to have collapsed a relatively short time after its construction and houses were later constructed on top of its ruins. Trdat's design closely follows that of Zvartnotz in its size and in its plan (a quatrefoil core surrounded by a circular ambulatory).

The Church of the Holy Apostles
The date of its construction is not known, but the earliest dated inscription on its walls is from 1031. It was founded by the Pahlavuni family and was used by the archbishops of Ani (many of whom belonged to that dynasty). It has a plan of a type called an inscribed quatrefoil with corner chambers. Only fragments remain of the church, but a narthex with spectacular stonework, built against the south side of the church, is still partially intact. It dates from the early 13th century. A number of other halls, chapels, and shrines once surrounded this church: Nicholas Marr excavated their foundations in 1909, but they are now mostly destroyed.

The mosque of Manuchihr
The mosque is named after its presumed founder, Manuchihr, the first member of the Shaddadid dynasty that ruled Ani after 1072. The oldest surviving part of the mosque is its still intact minaret. It has the Arabic word Bismillah ("In the name of God") in Kufic lettering high on its northern face. The prayer hall, half of which survives, dates from a later period (the 12th or 13th century). In 1906 the mosque was partially repaired in order for it to house a public museum containing objects found during Nicholas Marr's excavations. Restoration of the mosque started in June 2020.

The citadel
At the southern end of Ani is a flat-topped hill once known as Midjnaberd (the Inner Fortress). It has its own defensive walls that date back to the period when the Kamsarakan dynasty ruled Ani (7th century AD). Nicholas Marr excavated the citadel hill in 1908 and 1909. He uncovered the extensive ruins of the palace of the Bagratid kings of Ani that occupied the highest part of the hill. Also inside the citadel are the visible ruins of three churches and several unidentified buildings. One of the churches, the "church of the palace" is the oldest surviving church in Ani, dating from the 6th or 7th century. Marr undertook emergency repairs to this church, but most of it has now collapsed – probably during an earthquake in 1966.

The city walls

A line of walls that encircled the entire city defended Ani. The most powerful defences were along the northern side of the city, the only part of the site not protected by rivers or ravines. Here the city was protected by a double line of walls, the much taller inner wall studded by numerous large and closely spaced semicircular towers. Contemporary chroniclers wrote that King Smbat (977–989) built these walls. Later rulers strengthened Smbat's walls by making them substantially higher and thicker, and by adding more towers. Armenian inscriptions from the 12th and 13th century show that private individuals paid for some of these newer towers. The northern walls had three gateways, known as the Lion Gate, the Kars Gate, and the Dvin Gate (also known as the Chequer-Board Gate because of a panel of red and black stone squares over its entrance).

Other monuments
There are many other minor monuments at Ani. These include a convent known as the Virgins' chapel; a church used by Chalcedonian Armenians; the remains of a single-arched bridge over the Arpa river; the ruins of numerous oil-presses and several bath houses; the remains of a second mosque with a collapsed minaret; a palace that probably dates from the 13th century; the foundations of several other palaces and smaller residences; the recently excavated remains of several streets lined with shops; etc.

Cave Village
Directly outside of Ani, there was a settlement-zone carved into the cliffs. It may have served as "urban sprawl" when Ani grew too large for its city walls. Today, goats and sheep take advantage of the caves' cool interiors. One highlight of this part of Ani is a cave church with frescos on its surviving walls and ceiling.

Gallery

Panorama

In culture
Ani is one of the most popular female given names in Armenia.

Songs and poems have been written about Ani and its past glory. "Tesnem Anin u nor mernem" (Տեսնեմ Անին ու նոր մեռնեմ, Let me see Ani before I die) is a famous poem by Hovhannes Shiraz. It was turned into a song by Turkish-Armenian composer Cenk Taşkan. Ara Gevorgyan's 1999 album of folk instrumental songs is titled Ani.

Turkish niche perfume brand Nishane and perfumer Cecile Zarokian have created an extrait de parfum named Ani dedicated to the city in 2019, which has gathered positive reviews in the fragrance community. The artwork accompanying the perfume features one of the Ani churches.

See also
 List of kings of Ani
 List of World Heritage Sites in Turkey

References
Notes

Citations

Bibliography
General

Specific

Further reading
 A l'est d'Ani. forteresses et églises inédites du nord de l'Arménie (in French), by I. Augé, A. T. Baladian and Ph. Dangles, foreword by J.-P. Mahé, Paris, AIBL, 2020, 364 p., 270 images (online presentation on the Académie des Inscriptions et Belles-Lettres website).
.

External links
 

 360 Degree Virtual Tour Ani Armenian Cathedral – 360 Degree Virtual Tour Ani Armenian Cathedral
 360 Degree Virtual Tour Ani Armenian Cathedral – 360 Degree Virtual Tour Ani Armenian Cathedral
 Virtual Ani – has clickable maps, extensive history and photos
 Photos of Ani
 World Monuments Fund/Turkish Ministry of Culture Ani Cathedral conservation project
 World Monuments Fund/Turkish Ministry of Culture Church of the Holy Savior/Redeemer conservation project
 400+ pictures of Ani
 – a gallery of 27 photos of Ani

 Detailed video recording from the site July 2019
 Photos of Ani at the American Center of Research

 
Bagratid Armenia
Archaeological sites in Eastern Anatolia
Former populated places in Turkey
Ruined churches in Turkey
Former capitals of Armenia
Populated places of the Byzantine Empire
Buildings and structures in Kars Province
World Heritage Sites in Turkey